The following is a list of the 363 communes of the Charente department of France on 1 January 2023.

The communes cooperate in the following intercommunalities (as of 2020):
Communauté d'agglomération Grand Angoulême
Communauté d'agglomération du Grand Cognac
Communauté de communes des 4B Sud-Charente
Communauté de communes de Charente Limousine
Communauté de communes Cœur de Charente
Communauté de communes Lavalette Tude Dronne
Communauté de communes La Rochefoucauld - Porte du Périgord
Communauté de communes du Rouillacais
Communauté de communes Val de Charente

References

Lists of communes of France